Earl D. Brooks II (born January 11, 1956) is the 16th president of Trine University in Angola, Indiana, serving in that position since June 2000. His tenure is the second-longest in the institution’s history. Brooks is the longest-serving current college or university president in Indiana. Brooks has announced his plans to retire on May 31, 2023.

Early life and education 
Brooks was born January 11, 1956, in Pineville, Kentucky. He attended Powell Valley High School in Speedwell, Tennessee. A first-generation college student who grew up on his family farm in east Tennessee, Brooks earned his Bachelor of Science in animal science, his Master of Science in management and his Ph.D. in animal nutrition from the University of Tennessee.

Career 
Brooks worked at Lincoln Memorial University in Harrogate, Tennessee, throughout his early career, beginning as a biology instructor and eventually became senior vice president and professor of biological sciences. In the latter role, he served as chief operating officer for the university.

In 1997, he joined Wesley College in Dover, Delaware, as executive vice president and professor of science. During his tenure, the college experienced significant enrollment growth and earned a Circle of Excellence award from the Council for the Advancement and Support of Education for fundraising excellence.

Brooks became president of what was then Tri-State University in June 2000, succeeding 15th president R. John Reynolds.

Under his leadership, operating deficits have been eradicated and the university has balanced its budget for over 20 consecutive years. Enrollment has grown from 1,300 in 2000 to more than 8,500 today. The university has raised more than $250 million, including capital campaigns of $90 million and $125 million, each the largest in university history. The university earned a Circle of Excellence award from the Council for the Advancement and Support of Education for fundraising excellence in 2006. The campus has completed more than $200 million in new projects, including the Rick L. and Vicki L. James University Center, Ford Hall renovation, T. Furth Center for Performing Arts, Thunder Ice Arena, MTI Center and Steel Dynamics Inc. Center for Engineering and Computing.

Brooks led the transition of the university’s athletic programs from the NAIA to NCAA Division III, with Tri-State beginning NCAA provisional membership in fall 2004 and becoming a full NCAA Division III member in fall 2007. The university was accepted as a member of the Michigan Intercollegiate Athletic Association in 2002.

The university also greatly expanded its undergraduate programming and added its first graduate degrees, graduating its first master’s degree students in 2005 and its first Doctor of Physical Therapy students in 2017.

Honors and awards 
In 2018, Indiana Gov. Eric Holcomb presented Brooks with the Sagamore of the Wabash, given to those who render distinguished service to the state of Indiana. In 2022, he was honored with the Lifetime Achievement Award by Greater Fort Wayne Business Weekly and inducted into Trine University's Athletic Hall of Fame.

References 

1956 births
Living people
People from Bell County, Kentucky
University of Tennessee alumni
Trine University people
Heads of universities and colleges in the United States